Explorers of the New Century is the fifth novel by Booker shortlisted author Magnus Mills, published in 2005.

Plot Introduction

Two expeditions set out to be the first to reach "the Agreed Furthest Point", by two different routes.  As they encounter rigorous conditions and difficulties along the way, things begin to unravel. In quintessential Magnus Mills fashion, nothing is as it first seems, and there are lessons to be learned — as well as surprises to anticipate...

Reception

The Complete Review's assessment was "nice twist, nice approach", all reviews "very mixed reactions (and a variety of interpretations)."
David Grylls of the Sunday Times said, "As the book travels from the fatuous to the alarming, a fabular structure begins to emerge, hinting that themes of empire and exploitation, slavery and segregation, are being explored. Although the book remains teasingly vague, a political subtext surfaces. (...) But while the novel undoubtedly harbours darker elements, its most successful mode is deadpan humour."

References

External links
The Complete Review

2005 British novels
Bloomsbury Publishing books
Mariner Books books